The China Travel Service Building in Macau is a 24-storey office tower.

See also
 Lisboa Hotel
 World Trade Center Macau
 China Travel Service Building, Macau

References

Macau Peninsula
Skyscrapers in Macau
Buildings and structures in Macau
Landmarks in Macau
Skyscraper office buildings in China